Dynkin (Russian: Дынкин) is a Russian masculine surname, its feminine counterpart is Dynkina. It may refer to the following notable people:
 Aleksandr Dynkin, Russian economist
 Eugene Dynkin (1924–2014), Soviet and American mathematician known for
 Dynkin diagram
 Coxeter–Dynkin diagram
 Dynkin system
 Dynkin's formula
 Doob–Dynkin lemma
 Dynkin index

Russian-language surnames